The following is a list of awards and nominations received by the British rock band Queen.

Accolades

Inductions

Awards
Brit Awards

|-
| 1977
| "Bohemian Rhapsody"
| British Single of the Year
| 
|-
| 1982
| Greatest Hits
| British Album of the Year
| 
|-
| rowspan="2" | 1985
| The Works
| British Album of the Year
| 
|-
| Queen
| British Group
| 
|-
| rowspan="2" | 1990
| "The Invisible Man"
| British Video of the Year
| 
|-
| Queen
| Outstanding Contribution to Music
| 
|-
| rowspan="3" | 1992
| "These Are the Days of Our Lives"
| British Single of the Year
| 
|-
| Queen
| British Group
| 
|-
| Freddie Mercury
| Outstanding Contribution to Music
| 
|-
| 2005
| "We Are the Champions"
| British Song of 25 Year
| 
|}

Ivor Novello Awards

|-
| 1976
| "Bohemian Rhapsody"
| Best Selling British Record
| 
|-
| rowspan="2" | 1981
| "Flash"
| The Best Film Song, Theme or Score
| 
|-
| "Another One Bites the Dust"
| International Hit of the Year
| 
|-
| 1987
| Themselves
| Outstanding Contribution to British Music
| 
|-
| rowspan="2" | 1992
| "These Are the Days of Our Lives"
| Best Selling A-Side
| 
|-
| "The Show Must Go On"
| Best Song Musically And Lyrically
| 
|-
| 2005
| Themselves
| Outstanding Song Collection
| 
|}

Billboard Music Awards

The Billboard Music Awards are an annual awards show from Billboard Magazine.  The awards are based on sales data by Nielsen SoundScan and radio information by Nielsen Broadcast Data Systems.

|-
|rowspan="2"|2019
|-
|Themselves
|Top Rock Artist
|
|-
|2019
|Bohemian Rhapsody: The Original Soundtrack
|Top Soundtrack
|
|}

1974
Sounds: 3rd Best New British Band, 9th Best International Band
Disc: 10th Brightest Hope
NME: 2nd Most Promising New Name
1975
Melody Maker: 'Band of the Year'
Record Mirror: 2nd Best British Newcomer, 2nd Best Single ("Killer Queen"), 9th International Group
NME: 8th Best British Group, 7th Best Stage Band, 4th Most Promising Group In The World, 3rd Most Promising New Name, 17th Best World Group
Disc: Top Live Band, Top International Group, Top British Group, Top Single ("Killer Queen"), 3rd Best Album (Sheer Heart Attack), 5th Best Album (Queen II)
Ivor Novello Award to Mercury for "Killer Queen"
Golden Lion Award (Belgium) to Mercury for "Killer Queen"
Carl Allen Award for contribution to the Ballroom Dancing Industry
1976
NME: 1st British Stage Band, 2nd Group, 5th World Group, 3rd World Stage Band, Mercury: 7th World Singer, May: 3rd Top Guitarist, 1st British Single ("Bohemian Rhapsody"), 2nd Album ("A Night at the Opera")
Record Mirror / Disc: 1st Best British Group, 1st World Group, No. 1 Single ("Bohemian Rhapsody"), No. 6 Album (A Night at the Opera), Mercury: 5th British Singer, 6th World Singer, 4th British Songwriter, 5th World Songwriter, May: 4th British Musician, 4th World Musician
Sound: Best Band, Best Album (A Night at the Opera), Best Single ("Bohemian Rhapsody")
Ivor Novello Award to Mercury for "Bohemian Rhapsody"
1977
Brit Award: Best British Single of the Last 25 Years ("Bohemian Rhapsody")
Grammy Award nominations: Best Pop Vocal Performance by a Duo, Group or Chorus and Best Arrangement for Voices ("Bohemian Rhapsody")
Europe One Radio: Most Potential Rock Band
1979
Music Life, Japan: Top Group, Top Album (Jazz), Top Single, Top Singer, Top Guitarist, Top Drummer, Top Bass Player
1980
Juno Awards, Canada: Best Group, Best International Single ("Another One Bites the Dust"), Best International Album (The Game)
Record World USA: Top Male Group, Top Producer, Top Disco Crossover (All awarded for "Another One Bites the Dust")
Dick Clark Awards USA: Best Band
Circus Magazine USA: 2nd Best Group, 1st Live Show, No. 1 Album (The Game), No. 1 Single ("Another One Bites the Dust"), No.3 Single ("Crazy Little Thing Called Love"), Mercury: 2nd Male Vocalist, 3rd Best Songwriter, 3rd Best Keyboard Player; 3rd Best Guitarist, 3rd Best Bassist, 3rd Best Drummer
1981
Grammy Award nominations: Producer of the Year (Non-Classical) with Mack (The Game) and Best Rock Performance by a Duo or Group with Vocal ("Another One Bites the Dust")
American Music Award: Favorite Pop/Rock Single ("Another One Bites the Dust") and nomination for Favorite Pop/Rock Band/Duo/Group (The Game)
Music Life, Japan: Best Group, Best Vocalist, Best Bass Player, 2nd Best Guitarist, 2nd Drummer
NARM Award USA: Biggest Selling Single of 1980 ("Another One Bites the Dust")
1982
Brit Award nomination: Best British Album (Greatest Hits)
1984
Nordoff-Robbins Music Therapy Silver Clef Award: Outstanding Contribution to British Music
UK Video Awards: Highly Commended in Best Compilation Category for The Works EP. Best Video award for "Radio Ga Ga"
1985
Brit Award nominations: Best British Album and Best British Group (The Works)
1986
Daily Mirror Reader's Poll: Top British Group, Top Male Vocalist, 5th Best Album (A Kind of Magic)
Daily Express: Best Album Cover Award (A Kind of Magic)
British Video Awards: Top Music Video Award  (Live In Rio)
Worldwide Music Awards: Best Worldwide Group
1987
Sun: Best Male Vocalist for Mercury
Capital Radio London: Best Group
Ivor Novello Award: for Outstanding Contribution to British Music
British Video Awards: Best Video, Music category for Live In Budapest
1988
Golden Rose Festival, Montreux: International Music Media Conference: Best Long Form Video worldwide (The Magic Years)
Festerio, Rio de Janeiro, Brazil: Best video documentary (The Magic Years)
1989
Independent Television Awards: Best Band of the Eighties
US Film & Video Festival: Silver Screen Award (The Magic Years)
Diamond Awards, Antwerp: Best Special Effects Award  ("The Invisible Man")
1990
Brit Award: Outstanding Contribution to Music and nomination for Best Music Video
1991
American Film & Video Festival, Chicago: Innuendo won 1st Prize, "I'm Going Slightly Mad" won 3rd Prize for Creative Excellence in the Art Culture and Performing Arts category
Monitor Awards (International Teleproduction Society), New York City: Best Achievement in Music Video ("Innuendo")
1992
Brit Award: Mercury received a posthumous Outstanding Contribution To Music Award, Best British Single ("These Are the Days of Our Lives") and nominations for Best British Single ("Bohemian Rhapsody") and Best British Group (Innuendo).
Ivor Novello Award: Best Single ("These Are the Days of Our Lives"), May received a Best TV Commercial Music Award ("Driven by You")
Golden Giraffe Award: Greatest Hits II (Award given by the Association of Hungarian Record Producers)
MTV Awards: Best Video From A Movie  (Wayne's World)
US Film & Video Festival, Chicago: Gold Camera Awards (The Freddie Mercury Tribute), (Greatest Flix II), ("The Show Must Go On") ("These Are the Days of Our Lives")
1993
Ivor Novello Award: to Mercury ("Living on My Own") (posthumous)
American Society Of Composers, Authors & Publishers: Mercury posthumously awarded for "Bohemian Rhapsody" as the Most Played Record in the U.S. of 1993
Monitor Awards, Hollywood: "Red Couch" Awards (Greatest Flix II and "I'm Going Slightly Mad")
1997
Ivor Novello Award: Best Song Lyrically & Musically ("Too Much Love Will Kill You")
2001
Golden Rose Film Festival, Montreux: Prix de la Presse (Freddie Mercury: The Untold Story)
2002
Grammy Award nomination: Best Long Form Music Video for Freddie Mercury (Freddie Mercury: The Untold Story)
New York Film Festival: Gold World Medal for the Best Television and Entertainment Program (Variety Special Section), Gold World Medal for the Best Home Video (Music Video Section) for Freddie Mercury: The Untold Story
Capital FM Awards: Outstanding Contribution to Music
Guinness World Records: UK's best single of the past 50 years ("Bohemian Rhapsody")
Annual DVD Awards: Best DVD-Audio/Non Video (A Night at the Opera)
Surround Music Awards: "Most Adventurous Mix" and "Listener's Choice" (A Night at the Opera)
2003
Annual DVD Awards: Best DVD-Audio (The Game)
DVD Awards At The Universal Sheraton: DVD-Audio Of The Year (The Game)
Capital Legends Awards: Legendary Group
European Music DVD-Award: Best Live DVD (Live At Wembley Stadium)
Surround Music Award: "Best Mix: Non-Orchestral" (The Game)
2005
Brit Award nomination: BRITs 25 Best Song ("We Are the Champions")
2008
New York City radio station Q104.3 FM WAXQ names Queen's "Bohemian Rhapsody" number 13 in their 2008 Top 1,043 Songs Of All Time listener-generated countdown.
2011
At the MTV Europe Music Awards Queen received the Global Icon award.
2018
The band received the Grammy Lifetime Achievement Award.

Polls

 1999 - The band was voted the greatest band in music history.
 2005 - The band's performance at Live Aid is voted two times by a large selection of musicians and critics to be the greatest live show of all time.
 2007 - The band was voted the 'Best British Band Of All Time.'
 2008 - The band enters the Grammy Hall of Fame.

References

Awards
Lists of awards received by British musician
Lists of awards received by musical group